Mary Hinton (1896–1979) was a British stage, film and television actress. She was born as Emily Rachel Forster to the politician Henry Forster, 1st Baron Forster and the Honourable Rachel Cecily Douglas-Scott-Montagu, daughter of Henry Douglas-Scott-Montagu, 1st Baron Montagu of Beaulieu. She was a great-granddaughter of Walter Montagu Douglas Scott, 5th Duke of Buccleuch. Hinton became a regular British character actor for several decades. In the West End she appeared in Wilfrid Grantham's Mary Tudor (1935), Rose Franken's Claudia (1942) and Lesley Storm's Great Day (1945).

She was married to George Pitt-Rivers from 1915 to 1930 and had two sons Michael Pitt-Rivers and Julian Pitt-Rivers.

Selected filmography

Film
 Once in a New Moon (1934)
 Poison Pen (1939)
 Gaslight (1940)
 Penn of Pennsylvania (1941)
 Hatter's Castle (1942)
 Women Aren't Angels (1943)
 Broken Journey (1948)
 Quartet (1948)
 The Winslow Boy (1948)
 It's Not Cricket (1949)
 Trottie True (1949)
 Her Favourite Husband (1950)
 White Corridors (1951)
 Something Money Can't Buy (1952)
 The Second Mrs Tanqueray (1952)
 The Village (1953)
 Always a Bride (1953)

Television
 Dixon of Dock Green (1958, 2 episodes)
 Hancock's Half Hour (1959, 1 episode)
 Emergency-Ward 10 (1960, 3 episodes)
 Probation Officer (1961, 2 episodes)
 Dr. Finlay's Casebook (1963, 1 episode)
 Swizzlewick (1964, 6 episodes)
 The World of Wooster (1966, 1 episode)
 Out of the Unknown (1966, 1 episode)
 David Copperfield (1966, 3 episodes)

Yachtswoman 

She was a keen yachtswoman, owning the cutter Foxhound, and participating in the 1956 Newport Bermuda Race, as the only lady skipper. 

She was the first female Flag Officer of the Royal Ocean Racing Club.

References

Bibliography
 McFarlane, Brian . Lance Comfort. Manchester University Press, 2019. 
 Wearing, J.P. The London Stage 1940-1949: A Calendar of Productions, Performers, and Personnel.  Rowman & Littlefield,  2014.

External links

1896 births
1979 deaths
Actresses from London
British film actresses
British stage actresses
British television actresses
Daughters of barons
Mary